Boronia purdieana is a plant in the citrus family, Rutaceae and is endemic to the south-west of Western Australia. It is a shrub with pinnate leaves and yellow, four-petalled flowers arranged singly in leaf axils.

Description
The four stamens near the sepals have warty filaments and vestigial anthers, whilst the four near the petals have smooth filaments and fertile, reddish brown anthers. Flowering occurs from May to October.

Taxonomy and naming
Boronia purdieana was first formally described in 1904 by Ludwig Diels and the description was published in Botanische Jahrbücher für Systematik, Pflanzengeschichte und Pflanzengeographie. The specific epithet (purdieana) honours Alexander Purdie.

Two subspecies were described in 1998:

Distribution and habitat
Winter boronia grows in swampy areas and on coastal plains and rock outcrops. Subspecies purdieana is found near the west coast between the northern suburbs of Perth and Shark Bay with a disjunct population near Leonora. Subspecies calcicola occurs between Kalbarri National Park and Shark Bay.

Conservation
Both subspecies of Boronia purdieana are classified as "not threatened" by the Western Australian Government Department of Parks and Wildlife.

References

purdieana
Flora of Western Australia
Plants described in 1904
Taxa named by Ludwig Diels